Five ships of the Royal Navy have borne the name HMS Asia, after the continent of Asia:

 was a hulk purchased in 1694 and foundered in 1701.
 was a 64-gun third rate launched in 1764 and broken up in 1804.
 was a 74-gun third rate launched in 1811.  She was renamed HMS Alfred in 1819, reduced to 50-guns in 1828 and broken up in 1865.
 was an 84-gun second rate launched in 1824. She was used as a guardship from 1858 and was sold in 1908.
 was an auxiliary cruiser of the British Caspian Flotilla from 1918 to 1919.

Royal Navy ship names